The Volvo 262C is the first luxury coupé made by Volvo, after the four-cylinder P1800. Based on the 264 six-cylinder saloon, the 262C was designed in-house by Volvo's Jan Wilsgaard, but largely built by Bertone in Turin for the 1977-1981 model years.

Concept and design
The drivetrain, suspension, floor pan, and many of the body panels of the 262C were taken directly from the Volvo 260 sedan, with Bertone building the roof pillars, roof pan, windshield surround, cowl, and the upper parts of the doors. The roof of the 262C is about 10 cm lower than that of the 260 sedans. This had the effect of cramping interior space and the wide C-pillars made for small-sized rear side windows.

On the occasion of Volvo's 25th anniversary in the United States, Volvo North America charged Newport Conversions of Santa Ana, California, with converting the 262C into a convertible to give as a gift to the company CEO. This version was called the 262C Solaire. Volvo's Swedish headquarters, however, vetoed the project due to safety concerns, and only five cars were built in the end.

The 262C used the PRV engine, a V6 engine developed jointly by Peugeot, Renault, and Volvo. The engine used a Lambda-sond oxygen sensor system; this was the first use of this system on a production V engine.

Standard equipment included power windows and mirrors, central locking, full leather interior, cruise control, air conditioning, heated front seats, alloy wheels and electrically powered radio antenna. The only optional extras were a limited-slip differential, a choice of stereos, and the no-cost option of a Borg-Warner three-speed automatic instead of the four-speed manual with electrically operated overdrive. By 1981, the manual option had been deleted in the US.

Reception
Aimed mainly at the United States market, the 262C was Volvo's first entry into the luxury car market. About half of the annual production was earmarked for the United States. It competed against the Cadillac Eldorado and the Mercedes-Benz 280CE. A total of 6,622 cars were produced from 1978 until 1980. Available in one color combination the silver with black vinyl covered roof coupe "evades the classic ideals of beauty, regardless of the stylistic authorship."

Development

In 1979, the 262C was given a deeper trunk lid, wrap-around taillights, and thermostatic heater controls. Manual transmission cars got the shift linkage from the 242GT.

The engine was also reconfigured, with seven main bearings instead of four and an increase in compression ratio from 8.2:1 to 8.8:1. Also in 1980, the front air dam from the 242GT was added to the 262C.

In 1981, for the last year of production, the vinyl roof cover was deleted.

References

262C
Bertone vehicles
Coupés
Executive cars
Luxury vehicles
Rear-wheel-drive vehicles
Cars introduced in 1977
1980s cars